"Everybody Come On" is a 1999 single by American DJ and producer DJ Skribble, featuring Busta Rhymes, Rampage, Spliff Star (all of the Flipmode Squad), Consequence and Ed Lover.

Track listing
12" single
A1. "Everybody Come On" (NMCB 12")
A2. "Everybody Come On" (Original TV Track Edit)
B1. "Everybody Come On" (Original 12")
B2. "Everybody Come On" (NMCB Clean Edit)

UK CD maxi-single
 "Everybody Come On" (NMCB Radio Edit)
 "Everybody Come On" (Original Radio Edit)
 "Everybody Come On" (Stripe Remix Edit)
 "Everybody Come On" (NMCB 12" Mix)

Other releases
Also in 1999, a UK garage remix of the track was released by English duo Stanton Warriors on the Fifty First Recordings label.

2003 version

"Everybody Come On (Can U Feel It)" is a 2003 single by Mr Reds vs. DJ Skribble. Produced by English duo Stanton Warriors, the song is a mashup using the vocals from "Everybody Come On" by DJ Skribble and the instrumental backing track of "Can You Feel It" by Mr Reds. This version was a top 20 hit in the UK, peaking at No. 13 on the UK Singles Chart in mid-2003.

Track listing
UK CD single
 "Everybody Come On (Can U Feel It)" (Stanton Warriors Remix)
 "Everybody Come On" - DJ Skribble (NMCB Clean Edit) 
 "Can U Feel It" - Mr Reds
 Video

References

1999 songs
1999 singles
American hip hop songs
2003 singles
Stanton Warriors songs
UK garage songs
Mashup songs
FFRR Records singles
Warlock Records singles
Songs written by Kenny Gamble
Songs written by Leon Huff
Songs written by Busta Rhymes